Hurricane Diana was the first major hurricane to hit the East Coast of the United States in nearly 20 years. Diana was the ninth tropical cyclone, fourth named storm, first hurricane, and first major hurricane of the 1984 Atlantic hurricane season.  It caused moderate damage in North Carolina while it looped offshore and after it made landfall as a Category 2 hurricane.  Forming on September 8, Diana moved northward and wandered across North Carolina for a couple of days during mid-September, dropping heavy rainfall. Once it left the state and accelerated east-northeast, Diana quickly evolved into an extratropical cyclone. Watches and warnings were issued for the storm along the East coast between eastern Florida and Virginia. Damages to the United States totaled $65.5 million (1984 USD). Three indirect fatalities were caused by the cyclone.

Meteorological history

The origins of Hurricane Diana can be traced back to a stalled out  area of low pressure just north of the Bahamas along the tail end of a cold front on September 6. Shower and thunderstorm activity began to increase the next day but was generally disorganized. Around 1200 UTC on September 8, a ship in the vicinity of the low reported a sustained wind speed of 40 mph (65 km/h). A few hours later, based on satellite observations, the low was designated Tropical Storm Diana. With weak steering currents, Diana gradually intensified as it slowly moved towards the west over the next day, coming within 50 miles (85 km) of Cape Canaveral, Florida, before taking a sharp turn towards the north-northwest. As Diana neared Saint Augustine, Florida, it turned towards the northeast and intensified into a hurricane.

Under weak steering currents while detached to the front, Diana drifted westward, and came within 50 miles (85 km) of the Florida coast. Rather than continuing westward, where it would have hit near Cape Canaveral, Diana turned to the northwest where it paralleled the coastline. The storm, continually strengthening over the Gulf Stream, turned to the northeast and became a hurricane on September 10. On September 11 and September 12, Diana rapidly intensified to a peak of 130 mph (215 km/h) winds while remaining offshore.

An approaching frontal system caused Diana to execute a cyclonic loop, where cool, dry air caused it to weaken. The hurricane hit Wilmington, North Carolina as a weakening hurricane with maximum sustained winds of 100 mph (150 km/h) on September 13, and quickly weakened to a tropical storm over land.  The high pressure system that built in after Diana looped weakened, allowing the storm to move to the north and east.  After crossing the Outer Banks, Diana accelerated to the northeast, and after restrengthening to a  storm, became extratropical near Nova Scotia on September 16.

Preparations

Soon after advisories were initiated, gale warnings were issued between Cape Canaveral, Florida and Virginia Beach, Virginia during the afternoon of September 8.  During the morning of September 9, gale warnings were lowered south of St. Augustine, Florida.  As Diana strengthened into a hurricane, hurricane watches and gale warnings were raised between St. Augustine and Oregon Inlet, North Carolina.  By the morning of September 10, gale warnings were upgraded to hurricane warnings between Brunswick, Georgia and Oregon Inlet.  All warnings and watches south of Brunswick were dropped at that time.  By the morning of September 11, hurricane warnings were lowered south of Savannah, Georgia.  That afternoon, all warnings were lowered south of Cape Romain, South Carolina.

On the morning of September 12, all warnings were lowered south of Myrtle Beach, South Carolina.  Early in the morning of September 13, gale warnings were raised between Cape Romain and Myrtle Beach.  Later that morning, hurricane warnings were lowered between Wilmington, North Carolina and Oregon Inlet, and all warnings were dropped between Cape Lookout and Virginia Beach.  Gale warnings were then in effect between Wilmington and Cape Lookout.  Once inland, all warnings were lowered on the afternoon of September 13.  As the tropical storm moved offshore, gale warnings went into effect between the mornings of September 14 and September 15 between Cape Lookout and Chincoteague, Virginia.

Along the North Carolina coastline, state troopers were deployed to assist residents in evacuating and preparing for the hurricane. South Carolina governor Mike Daniel declared a state of emergency and placed the national guard on standby. Schools throughout the Carolinas and Georgia were closed. Most beaches were closed due to strong rip currents and beach erosion. Approximately 94 families were relocated from their mobile homes near Beaufort, North Carolina by state officials. A 24-hour emergency operations center was also established. The Coast Guard moved all available boats in the area to a position where they could be deployed immediately if needed.

Along the Georgia coastline, The Golden Isles of Georgia were evacuated due to large swells produced by Diana. Two nursing homes in Tybee Island were evacuated and a voluntary evacuation was issued for all residents in the town. Several shelters were also opened at schools in a few counties; however, relatively few families sought refuge in them. Local schools and beaches were also closed for the duration of the storm's passage.

Impact and aftermath

However, it looped and weakened just offshore and made landfall as a Category 2 hurricane. Most of the damage was experienced between Wilmington, North Carolina and Myrtle Beach, South Carolina. The Carolina Power and Light Brunswick Nuclear Power Plant recorded winds of over 75 mph, making Hurricane Diana the first hurricane to bring hurricane-force winds to a nuclear power plant. Some yard damage was seen, but the plant was mostly unaffected.

Three indirect deaths were reported from Diana. One person died from a heart attack while making hurricane preparations, and the other two were from automobile accidents. Following the storm, President Ronald Reagan declared five North Carolina counties as a federal disaster area, allowing the affected regions to receive government funds and assistance. Funds were also allocated for the repairing of roads and sewers.

See also

 List of North Carolina hurricanes (1980–1999)
 Other storms of the same name

References

External links
Monthly Weather Review
Rainfall info

Diana
Diana (1984)
Diana (1984)
1984 meteorology
1984 in North Carolina
1984 natural disasters in the United States
September 1984 events in the United States
Diana